Alexandre Miguel Flora Pimenta (born 2 March 1999) is a Portuguese footballer who plays as a forward for Leixões U23.

Club career
He joined the youth squad of Venezia in the summer of 2016.

He made his Serie B debut for Venezia on 4 May 2019 in a game against Pescara, as a 25th-minute substitute for Francesco Di Mariano.

Before the 2021–22 season, Pimenta joined Leixões, where he was assigned to the Under-23 squad that plays in the national Under-23 championship, Liga Revelação.

Personal life
He was at the airport during the 2016 Brussels bombings, but escaped unharmed.

References

External links
 

1999 births
Sportspeople from Coimbra
Living people
Portuguese footballers
Association football forwards
Venezia F.C. players
Leixões S.C. players
Serie B players
Campeonato de Portugal (league) players
Portuguese expatriate footballers
Expatriate footballers in Italy
Portuguese expatriate sportspeople in Italy